Shannon Township is a township in Atchison County, Kansas, United States. As of the 2010 census, its population was 1,282.

History
Shannon Township was established in 1855 as one of the three original townships of Atchison County.

Geography
Shannon Township covers an area of  around the north and west of the county seat of Atchison. According to the USGS, it contains five cemeteries: Cummings, Mount Calvary, Mount Vernon, Myers and Taylor.

The streams of Deer Creek and Independence Creek run through this township.

References
 USGS Geographic Names Information System (GNIS)

External links
 US-Counties.com
 City-Data.com

Townships in Atchison County, Kansas
Townships in Kansas
1855 establishments in Kansas Territory